Marcin Baszczyński (born 7 June 1977 in Ruda Śląska) is a former Polish footballer.

Club career 
Baszczyński started his career at Pogoń Ruda Śląska. In 1995, he joined Ruch Chorzów. In 2000, he moved to Wisła Kraków. With Wisła he won six Polish League Championships in 2000–01, 2002–03, 2003–04, 2004–05, 2007–08 and 2008–09 seasons.

In June 2011, he joined Polonia Warsaw on a two-year contract.

In January 2013, he rejoined Ruch Chorzów where he spent the last year of his playing career.

International career 
Baszczyński has appeared 35 times for Poland, scoring once.

He was selected to the 23-man national squad for the 2006 FIFA World Cup finals held in Germany.

International goals

Statistics 
 (correct as of 5 July 2012)

Honours

Ruch Chorzów 
 Polish Cup: 1995–96

Wisła Kraków 
 Ekstraklasa: 2000–01, 2002–03, 2003–04, 2004–05, 2007–08, 2008–09
 Polish Cup: 2001–02, 2002–03
 Ekstraklasa Cup: 2000–01
 Polish SuperCup: 2001

Individual 
 Ekstraklasa Defender of the Year: 2004, 2005

References

External links 
 
 

1977 births
Living people
Sportspeople from Ruda Śląska
Polish footballers
Poland international footballers
Polish expatriate footballers
Association football defenders
Ruch Chorzów players
Wisła Kraków players
Atromitos F.C. players
Polonia Warsaw players
2006 FIFA World Cup players
Ekstraklasa players
Super League Greece players
Expatriate footballers in Greece